George Washington Memorial Park is a cemetery located in Paramus, in Bergen County, New Jersey, United States. It was established in 1939 as a "whites only" cemetery.

Noted burials 

 O'Kelly Isley Jr. – member of the Isley Brothers R&B group
 Lizette Parker (1971–2016), Mayor of Teaneck, New Jersey (2014–2016), first female African-American mayor of any municipality in Bergen County.
 Vito Trause (1925–2019),  United States Army veteran, World War II prisoner of war, and well-known community figure in New Jersey.
 Luther Vandross (1951–2005), rhythm and blues singer, dominant R&B artists on Billboard charts. 
 Lamont Coleman (1974–1999), known professionally as Big L, American rapper and songwriter.
 Tommy Eboli

References

External links
 

Paramus, New Jersey
Cemeteries in Bergen County, New Jersey
1939 establishments in New Jersey